Constans II (died early 411) was caesar or heir apparent to his father Emperor Constantine III from 407 to 409 and co-emperor with Constantine and the Western Roman Emperor Honorius from 409 until his death. Constans was a monk prior to his father being acclaimed emperor by the army in Britain in early 407. Constans was summoned to the new imperial court, in Gaul, appointed to the position of Caesar and swiftly married so that a dynasty could be founded.  In Hispania, Honorius's relatives rose in 408 and expelled Constantine's administration. An army under the generals Constans and Gerontius was sent to deal with this and Constantine's authority was re-established. Honorius acknowledged Constantine as co-emperor in early 409 and Constantine immediately raised Constans to the position of co-emperor, theoretically equal in rank to Honorius as well as to Constantine. Later in 409 Gerontius rebelled, proclaimed his client Maximus emperor and incited barbarian groups in Gaul to rise up. Constans was sent to quash the revolt, but was defeated and withdrew to Arles. In 410, Constans was sent to Hispania again. Gerontius had strengthened his army with barbarians and defeated Constans; the latter withdrew north and was defeated again and killed at Vienne early in 411. Gerontius then besieged Constantine in Arles.

Background

Following the death of the Roman emperor Theodosius I in 395 the Roman Empire was divided between his two sons: Arcadius became emperor of the Eastern Roman Empire and ten-year-old Honorius of the Western. Honorius was underage and the leading general Stilicho became hugely influential and the de facto commander-in-chief of the Roman armies in the west. Both the Eastern and Western Empires were suffering from incursions of large groups from Germanic tribes, whom the Romans referred to generically as "barbarians". During this period Roman Britain was suffering raids by the Scoti, Saxons and Picts. In 401 or 402 Stilicho needed military manpower for wars with the Visigoths and the Ostrogoths and so stripped Hadrian's Wall of troops.

Prelude

In 406 the approximately 6,000 troops of the Roman field army based in Roman Britain were dissatisfied. They had not been paid for several years, a large contingent had left to fight on the continent four years earlier and had not returned, the coastal defences had been dismantled to form the new field army and their commander had been replaced. They revolted and determined to choose their own leader. Their first choice was a man named Marcus whom they appointed emperor. After a short period, unhappy with his performance, they killed him and appointed Gratian. He also failed to meet the troops' expectations and was killed after four months. They next chose as their leader a man named after the famed emperor of the early fourth century, Constantine the Great, who had himself risen to power through a military coup in Britain. Flavius Claudius Constantinus was a common soldier and early in 407, possibly February, his fellows acclaimed him as emperor.

Rebellion in Roman Britain was not unusual, a contemporary described it as a "province rich in usurpers". It was on the periphery of the Empire and there was a common view that it was overlooked in terms of resources and patronage. However, such revolts were usually short-lived; Constantine was uncommon in both establishing a lasting power base and in successfully exporting his rebellion to the mainland. Constantine moved quickly: he appointed generals in Gaul and crossed the Channel at Bononia (modern Boulogne). He took with him all of the 6,000 or so mobile troops left in Britain and their commander, the general Gerontius. The Roman Army of Gaul declared for him, followed by the civilian administration in Hispania (modern Spain and Portugal). The central Roman authorities did not respond to the Germanic invasion, while Constantine's forces got the better of at least one confrontation with the Vandals. Constantine also negotiated agreements with the Germanic groupings of the Franks, Alamanni and the Burgundians, thus securing the line of the Rhine. The main Vandal force and their allies moved into northern Gaul (modern Belgium).

The Western Roman emperor, Honorius, and his commander-in-chief Stilicho, were in conflict with the Eastern Roman Empire and had a tenuous alliance with a large force of Visigoths under Alaric. Caught between different threats they sent a small army led by Sarus the Goth west to put down Constantine's revolt while Stilicho's main army waited on events. Sarus defeated one of Constantine's armies in a pitched battle. Constantine then personally moved against Sarus, but was besieged in Valence. Another army, led by Gerontius and Edobichus and largely made up of freshly recruited Franks and Alamanni, arrived to relieve Valence after a week of siege. Sarus was forced to retreat into Italy. With this success Constantine established control over most of Gaul and the Alpine passes into Italy.

Life

Caesar

Little is known of Constans, the eldest son of Constantine, prior to his father being declared emperor. Constantine's oldest son was a monk at the time his father rebelled, but he was summoned to the new imperial court. Constantine appointed him to the position of caesara senior, formal position that also recognised him as heir apparent. He was swiftly married so a dynasty could be founded. By May 408 Constantine had captured Arles and made it his capital, taking over the existing imperial administration and officials, and appointing Apollinaris as chief minister (with the title of ). Heros was installed as a pliant archbishop of Arles in spite of local opposition. Constantine commenced minting large quantities of good quality coins at Arles and made a show of being an equal of both the Western and Eastern Emperors.

Early in 408 Constans was sent with Gerontius and an army into Hispania. Hispania was a stronghold of the House of Theodosius, but on Constantine's initial landing on the continent, Honorius's partisans had been either unwilling or militarily unable to oppose his assumption of control. When Sarus seemed on the verge of ending Constantine's revolt, two members of Honorius's familyDidymus and Verinianusrebelled and overthrew Constantine's regime in Hispania. When Sarus withdrew to Italy the knowledge of the large new army assembling at Ticinum with the intention of shortly engaging Constantine encouraged them to persist and even to attempt to seal the Pyrenean passes. Constantine feared that Honorius's cousins would organise an attack from that direction while troops under Sarus and Stilicho attacked him from Italy in a pincer manoeuvre. He struck first, at Hispania. Constans and Gerontius's army forced a pass and was reinforced. Constans established himself at Saragossa and rebuilt the civilian administration. Gerontius took the army and decisively defeated Honorius's supporters at a battle in Lusitania where Didymus and Verinianus were captured. With Hispania back under Constantine's control Constans left his new wife at Saragossa and returned to Arles to report to his father. Didymus and Verinianus accompanied him and were executed there as civilian rebels.

On 1 May 408 the emperor of the Eastern Empire, Arcadius, died, leaving a seven-year-old heir, Theodosius II. A disagreement arose between Stilicho and Honorius, who each wished to travel to Constantinoplethe capital of the Eastern Empireto represent the Western Empire's interests. Stilicho got his way: he was to leave for the east while Honorius was to remain in Ravenna, the capital of the Western Empire. But a rift between him and Honorius was obvious. The Roman establishment, led by the senior bureaucrat Olympius, worked to oppose Stilicho by spreading rumours that he wished to travel east to depose Theodosius and set his own son, Eucherius, on the throne. On 13 August Honorius was formally reviewing the army about to set out from Ticinum against Constantine. With him were many of the senior officers and officials of the Western Empire. The troops mutinied, slaughtering Stilicho's supporters but respecting the person of the Emperor. Stilicho sought sanctuary, then surrendered and was executed on 22 August.

Co-emperor
The native parts of the Army of Italy, encouraged by Olympius, started slaughtering Goths: the wives and children of their fellow soldiers who were living in Italian cities, sometimes overtly as hostages for their husbands and fathers' good behaviour, were easy targets. Those Goths who could fled north and joined Alaric, greatly increasing his fighting strength. Alaric promptly crossed the Alps and headed south through Italy, devastating the countryside. He camped his army outside Rome and demanded a huge ransom.

Late in 408 Constantine sent an embassy to Ravenna. Needing to placate him, Honorius acknowledged him as co-emperor and sent a purple robe as formal recognition. The pair were joint consuls for 409. At around this time Constantine raised Constans to the position of co-emperor, theoretically equal in rank to Honorius or Theodosius, as well as to Constantine. He took the regnal name of Imperator Caesar Flavius Constans Augustus. Honorius continued to refuse to reach an agreement with Alaric. The Visigoths in retaliation continued to roam across Italy and extort vast sums from the city of Rome. Alaric elevated his own emperor, the senator Priscus Attalus, to no avail. On 24 August 410 the Visigoths entered Rome and pillaged the city for three days.

In spring or summer 409 Constans was sent back to Hispania. Either before Constans left Arles or while he was travelling, Gerontius rebelled and proclaimed his client Maximus emperor. Maximus was an important figure in his own right, but it was clear he was controlled by Gerontius. They set up court at Tarraco (modern Tarragona). Gerontius was concerned that he would not be able to withstand the military force Constans could bring to bear and so attempted to incite the barbarians who had entered Gaul late in 406 against Constantine. These had been quiescent in the north of the territory, but now set off across Gaul for the rich territories of Aquitaine and Narbonensis (modern southern and south-west France). They spread devastation across these areas, much to the horror of the populace. Concentrating on the threat from Constans, Gerontius weakened his garrisons in the Pyrenean passes and in autumn 409 much of the barbarian force entered Hispania. Eventually Gerontius was able to reach a modus operandi with some of these groups whereby they supplied him with military forces, which enabled him to take the offensive against Constans.

Death

Meanwhile, Constans, with an army commanded by a general named Justus, attempted to subdue Gerontius. He failed, although no details are known, and returned to Arles in spring 410. At about the same time Constantine returned from an abortive invasion of Italy. Given the difficulties the Visigoths were creating in Italy, Gerontius was considered a greater threat than Honorius. Edobichus was again sent north to raise troops from the Franks while Constans returned to confront Gerontius with a fresh army. Details are again unclear, but it seems likely that Gerontius was simultaneously advancing on Arles. The two armies clashed and Constans was defeated. He fell back to the north with what was left of his army, hoping to be reinforced by Edobichus. But Gerontius caught him at Vienne, probably early in 411, defeated his army and killed Constans. Gerontius's army then marched on Arles and besieged Constantine.

Aftermath
In 411 Honorius appointed a new general, Flavius Constantius, who took the Army of Italy over the Alps and arrived at Arles while Gerontius was outside the city. Many of Gerontius's troops deserted to Constantius and Gerontius withdrew to Hispania with the remainder. There, in a hopeless position, Gerontius committed suicide. Constantius's army took over the siege. Meanwhile, Edobichus raised troops in northern Gaul amongst the Franks and Alamanni, combined them with those of the Army of Gaul still loyal to Constantine and marched to Constantine's assistance. Constantius defeated this force in an ambush. Constantine, his hopes fading after the troops guarding the Rhine abandoned him to support yet another claimant to the imperial throne, the Gallic Roman Jovinus, surrendered to Constantius along with his surviving son Julian. Despite the promise of his life, and the assumption of clerical office, Constantius had the former soldier and Julian beheaded in either August or September 411. His head was mounted on a pole and presented to Emperor Honorius on 18 September.

Constantius withdrew in the face of Jovinus's forces. In 413 a Visigoth army, now allied with Honorius, suppressed Jovinus's revolt. Constantius took over Stilicho's role as the main power in the Western Empire and generalissimo. He was broadly able to recover the situation for the central authorities and to enable reconstruction. Gaul was pacified, the barbarians in Hispania were in large part subdued, the Visigoths were settled on land in Aquitaine as Roman allies. Roman rule never returned to Britain after Constantine stripped its defences.

Legend
In Geoffrey of Monmouth's popular and imaginative Historia Regum Britanniae  Constantine III is also known as Constantine II of Britain and Constans is elected by the Britons as their king after Constantine's death. Hence Constans, through his younger brother Uther Pendragon, becomes an uncle of the legendary King Arthur.

Notes, citations and sources

Notes

Citations

Sources

 
 
 
 

 
 
 
 
 
 
 

 
 
 
 

5th-century Roman emperors
411 deaths
Arthurian characters
British traditional history
5th-century murdered monarchs
Year of birth unknown
Caesars (heirs apparent)
Sons of Roman emperors